Aubregrinia is a genus of plant in the family Sapotaceae first described as a genus in 1935.

There is only one known species, Aubregrinia taiensis native to West Africa (Ghana, Liberia, Ivory Coast).

The genus name of Aubregrinia is in honour of both André Aubréville and François Pellegrin (Aubréville, Pellegrin). 

The species is listed as critically endangered.

References

 
Sapotaceae genera
Monotypic asterid genera
Flora of West Tropical Africa
Critically endangered plants
Taxonomy articles created by Polbot
Taxa named by André Aubréville
Taxa named by François Pellegrin